In geometry, the truncated hexagonal trapezohedron is the fourth in an infinite series of truncated trapezohedra. It has 12 pentagon and 2 hexagon faces. It can be constructed by taking a hexagonal trapezohedron and truncating the polar axis vertices.

Weaire–Phelan structure 
Another form of this polyhedron has D2d symmetry and is a part of a space-filling honeycomb along with an irregular dodecahedron, called Weaire–Phelan structure.

See also 
 Goldberg polyhedron

External links
 
 Conway Notation for Polyhedra Try: "t6dA6".

Polyhedra